The 2012 American Indoor Football season was the league's seventh overall season, and first under the AIF name. AIF Championship Bowl V was won by the Cape Fear Heroes who defeated the California Eagles and completed a perfect 9-0 record (including playoffs).

Standings

 Green indicates clinched playoff berth
 Purple indicates division champion
 Grey indicates suspended from league

Playoffs

References

American Indoor Football seasons
2012 in American football